The 1973–74 season was the 75th completed season of The Football League.

Don Revie marked his last season as Leeds United's manager by guiding them to league championship glory, before taking over from Sir Alf Ramsey as the England national football team manager, with England having failed to qualify for the 1974 World Cup. Revie's conquering side had a two-horse race with Liverpool all season but won in the end, taking the title for the second time in their history by five points. Newly promoted Burnley adapted well to life back in the top flight, finishing in sixth place.

Manchester United were relegated from the First Division just six years after winning the European Cup at the end of a traumatic season. Their 36-year stay at the top was finally ended by a 1–0 home defeat against Manchester City. Former United striker Denis Law scored City's winning goal. But Birmingham City's win on that same afternoon would have sent United down even if they had beaten City. Despite this the board kept faith in manager Tommy Docherty as the man to regain the club's top flight place.

Joining United in the Second Division were Norwich City and Southampton. This was the first season in which the League introduced three relegation places from the top division.

Former Leeds player Jack Charlton had a fine debut in management by guiding Middlesbrough to the Second Division title and a place in the First Division. Second in the table were Luton Town, who finished 15 points behind the runaway champions. Third-placed Carlisle United, managed by Alan Ashman (who won the FA Cup with West Bromwich Albion in 1968), gained a place in the First Division for the first, and so far only, time in their history, completing a rapid rise from the Fourth Division to the First Division. Crystal Palace, Preston North End and Swindon Town were all relegated.

Promotion from the Third Division was secured by champions Oldham Athletic, Bristol Rovers and York City, which at the time represented York's highest ever League finish. Cambridge United, Shrewsbury Town, Southport and Rochdale were all relegated.

Peterborough United won Division Four and were promoted along with Gillingham, Colchester United and Bury. The league's re-election system voted in favour of the bottom four league clubs and there were no departures or arrivals in the league in 1974.

Final league tables and results

The tables below are reproduced here in the exact form that they can be found at The Rec.Sport.Soccer Statistics Foundation website and in Rothmans Book of Football League Records 1888–89 to 1978–79, with home and away statistics separated.

Beginning with the season 1894–95, clubs finishing level on points were separated according to goal average (goals scored divided by goals conceded), or more properly put, goal ratio. In case one or more teams had the same goal difference, this system favoured those teams who had scored fewer goals. The goal average system was eventually scrapped beginning with the 1976–77 season.

Since the Fourth Division was established in the 1958–59 season, the bottom four teams of that division have been required to apply for re-election.

Match results are drawn from Rothmans for all divisions.

First Division

It was a successful final season at the First Division's two leading clubs for their long-serving and highly successful managers who had both transformed their clubs on and off the field during lengthy reigns lasting more than a decade. Don Revie guided Leeds United to the title before calling time of 13 years as manager at Elland Road to take charge of the England team. Bill Shankly announced his retirement as Liverpool manager after 15 years after they finished second in the league and triumphed 3-0 over Newcastle United in the FA Cup Final.

Despite the controversial resignation of manager Brian Clough in October, Derby County finished third after their former player Dave Mackay returned to the Baseball Ground as Clough's successor. Ipswich Town continued to thrive among the First Division's leading company by finishing fourth in their fifth campaign under Bobby Robson. Stoke City enjoyed another strong season, finishing fifth, with England goalkeeper Peter Shilton keeping opposition strikers at bay after his predecessor Gordon Banks retired due to an eye injury suffered in a car crash. Burnley enjoyed a strong return to the First Division after two seasons away by finishing sixth.

Manchester United's 36-year spell in the First Division ended in relegation, while their cross-city rivals finished 14th and were beaten in the Football League Cup final by Wolverhampton Wanderers. Southampton's eight-year spell in the First Division ended in relegation despite 21 goals from the division's top scorer Mick Channon and a change of manager from Ted Bates to Lawrie McMenemy before Christmas. Norwich City's second season among the elite ended in relegation.

Results

Maps

Second Division

Jack Charlton made a superb start to his managerial career by guiding Middlesbrough to the Second Division title - and a place in the First Division - by a margin of 15 points above runners-up Luton Town, who ended their 14-year exile from the elite despite financial difficulties. The final promotion place was snatched by Carlisle United, who reached the First Division for the first time in their history. Orient missed out on promotion by a single point. Other teams who just missed out on promotion included Nottingham Forest, 
Sunderland and West Bromwich Albion.

Crystal Palace were relegated for a second successive season, while Preston North End went down in their first season under the management of the legendary Bobby Charlton, who then re-registered himself as a player in his efforts to reverse the decline of the once great Lancashire club. Swindon Town went down in bottom place after five seasons in the Second Division.

Results

Maps

Third Division

Results

Maps

Fourth Division

Results

 Scunthorpe United v Exeter City was never played; Exeter failed to turn up and Scunthorpe were awarded two points.

Maps

See also
1973-74 in English football

External links
 Season 1973-74 complete complete lineups, tables and squads at Historical Football Lineups

References

Ian Laschke: Rothmans Book of Football League Records 1888–89 to 1978–79. Macdonald and Jane’s, London & Sydney, 1980.

 
English Football League seasons